HM-41 is an Iranian 155 mm howitzer based on the KH179, which was imported from South Korea during the Iran–Iraq War. It has a 155 mm/39 caliber barrel with a muzzle brake to lessen the recoil.

According to Iranian sources, the HM-41 weighs 6,890 kg, the same weight as the South Korean KH179. The HM-41's main components are also very similar in appearance to the KH179's CN79 barrel, RM79 recoil buffer, and CG79 mount and firing a rocket-assisted High-Explosive (HE) projectile, a maximum range of 30 km can be achieved. Firing an unassisted HE projectile, a maximum range of 22 km can be obtained.

The HM-41 has been offered for export, but no country is known to be using it except Iran.

Development

A wheeled self-propelled version was reported to be under development. The first prototype was finished in 2011.

In 2012, Iran unveiled laser guided Basir 155 mm artillery shells which were tested by an HM 41 howitzer.

Users

References

External links 
 Cold War Online

Artillery of Iran
Islamic Republic of Iran Army